Deborah Theaker (born April 6, 1964) is a Canadian actress. She is best known as Casey Edison on the Lucasfilm science fiction satire Maniac Mansion which ran from 1990 until 1993.

Early life and education 
Theaker was born in Moose Jaw, Saskatchewan, Canada. In 1985, she graduated from the University of Saskatchewan and later moved to Toronto, where she became a member of The Second City's resident company.

Career 
Since 1987, she has played roles in various television shows and movies, including The Kids in the Hall, Joey, Howie Mandel's Sunny Skies, Desperate Housewives, Rat Race, Entourage, Bones, and Lemony Snicket's A Series of Unfortunate Events as well as the Stargate SG-1 season-eight episode entitled "Citizen Joe." She is a member of Christopher Guest's cinematic repertory company and has appeared in four films and multiple commercials for Guest. Theaker guest-starred as The Caterer in an episode of the first season of Curb Your Enthusiasm. Theaker then guest-starred in the third season of the acclaimed sitcom Husbands.

Filmography

Film

Television

References

External links

Deborah Theaker profile on Northern Stars
Second City Toronto - Alumni list
Gerald - The official film web site

1964 births
Canadian film actresses
Canadian television actresses
Living people
University of Saskatchewan alumni
Actresses from Saskatchewan
People from Moose Jaw